Michal Beran (born 22 August 2000) is a Czech footballer who plays as a midfielder for Bohemians 1905 on loan from SK Slavia Prague.

Youth career
At youth level he played for 1. FC Slovácko or Bohemians Praha 1905.

Senior career
After traveling to Holland in 2018 with Johnny Reynolds to trial with PEC Zwolle, Beran signed for Slovan Liberec for the 2018–19 season, with Reynolds signing for ADO Den Haag.

FC Slovan Liberec
On 19 July 2018 he moved to FC Slovan Liberec in Czech First League. Since then he played for both the first and reserve team (reserve team played in Bohemian Football League). For reserve team he played 11 matches and scored 1 goal. For the first team he played 12 matches in Czech First League, scoring 1 goal.

SK Slavia Prague
On 3 August 2020 he moved to the Czech First League champion SK Slavia Prague. He played his first match for this team on 16 January 2021 against SK Sigma Olomouc.

FC Slovan Liberec (loan)
On 24 August 2020 he was loaned back to Slovan Liberec. In six months long loan he played in 10 league matches without scoring a goal. He also played in 3 qualifying matches and in 5 group stage matches in 2020-2021 UEFA Europa League against FK Riteriai, FCSB, APOEL Nicosia, KAA Gent, Red Star Belgrade and TSG Hoffenheim also without scoring a goal.

International career
He had played international football at under-15, 16 and 21 level for Czech Republic U15, Czech Republic U16 and Czech Republic U21. He played in 4 matches without scoring a goal.

Media 
Beran appears in Football Manager 2020, a football management simulation video game developed by Sports Interactive and published by Sega.  He appears in each updated version up to and including Football Manager 2023 (officially abbreviated as FM23).

References

External links
 Michal Beran at WorldFootball.net
 Michal Beran Profile at Fotbal.cz
 Michal Beran at Soccerway

2000 births
Living people
Czech footballers
Czech Republic under-21 international footballers
Czech Republic youth international footballers
Association football midfielders
Czech First League players
SK Slavia Prague players
FC Slovan Liberec players